The Pink House is an uninhabited historic house and popular photography and painting subject located at 60 Plum Island Turnpike, Newbury, Massachusetts, United States.  The house was built in 1925 and was privately owned until it was sold to Parker River National Wildlife Refuge for $375,000 in 2011. The house is considered by many to be a local icon and is the subject of a grassroots campaign to buy back the property from the refuge to preserve the house.

Origin legend
The house's notoriety is in part due to a popular local urban legend about its creation. The story suggests the house's location was a result of a divorce in which the wife demanded an exact replica of their Newburyport house, but failed to specify the location, resulting in the spiteful husband building it on the edge of town, in the Great Marsh with saltwater plumbing. For this reason, the building is often listed as an example of a spite house.

Preservation movement
In 2015, amid community concerns the Parker River National Wildlife Refuge would demolish the property, a group founded by local residents was formed to advocate for the preservation of the house. The refuge, which had originally planned on using the property for school field trip bus parking, agreed to postpone demolition to explore alternatives. In 2018, refuge staff met with members of Essex County Greenbelt, a conservation organization, to discuss the option of a land transfer.

References

External links

Parker River National Wildlife Refuge. The National Wildlife Refuge that owns the Pink House and property.
Support The Pink House Inc, An organization created to preserve and maintain the Pink House.
Essex County Greenbelt. A land trust attempting to trade land with Parker River National Wildlife Refuge to acquire the Pink House.

Houses in Newbury, Massachusetts
Houses completed in 1922
American Foursquare architecture
Spite houses